Jacqui Janse van Rensburg is a South African international lawn bowler.

In 2019 she won the fours silver medal and triples bronze medal at the Atlantic Bowls Championships.

References

Living people
South African female bowls players
Year of birth missing (living people)